The 1951 Cornell Big Red football team was an American football team that represented Cornell University as an independent during the 1951 college football season. In its fifth season under head coach George K. James, the team compiled a 6–3 record and outscored its opponents 207 to 139. Vic Pujo was the team captain. 

Cornell played its home games at Schoellkopf Field in Ithaca, New York.

Schedule

References

Cornell
Cornell Big Red football seasons
Cornell Big Red football